Shumka may refer to:
 Shumka (leafhopper), a genus of leafhoppers in the family Cicadellidae
 Shumka (dance), a traditional dance of Ukraine